Call Us What You Want but Don't Call Us in the Morning is a DVD released by Welsh rock trio Stereophonics. The DVD features all music videos from the band's first and second albums. It was released in 2000.

Track listing
Word Gets Around
Local Boy in the Photograph (1997 version)
More Life in a Tramps Vest
A Thousand Trees
Traffic
Local Boy in the Photograph (1998 version)
Traffic (from Top Of The Pops)

Performance and Cocktails
The Bartender and the Thief
Just Looking
Pick a Part That's New
I Wouldn't Believe Your Radio
Hurry Up and Wait
Mama Told Me Not to Come

Stereophonics video albums
V2 Records video albums
2000 video albums
Music video compilation albums
2000 compilation albums